Kilmer Serjus McCully is the Chief of Pathology and Laboratory Medicine Services for the United States Department of Veterans Affairs Medical Center in West Roxbury, Massachusetts.  McCully was the first to propose the homocysteine theory of cardiovascular disease, and is the author of the book, The Homocysteine Revolution.

Selected papers
McCully K.S., “Vascular pathology of homocysteinemia: implications for the pathogenesis of arteriosclerosis”, American Journal of Pathology. (1969), 56: pp. 111–128.
McCully K.S., “Chemical pathology of homocysteine”, I. Atherogenesis Annals of Clinical and Laboratory Science (1993), 23: pp. 477–493.
McCully K.S., “Homocysteine and vascular disease”, Nature Medicine (1996), 2: pp. 386–389.
McCully K.S., “Homocysteine, folate, vitamin B6 and cardiovascular disease”, Journal of the American Medical Association (1998), 279: pp. 392–393.
McCully K.S., “Atherosclerosis, serum cholesterol and the homocysteine theory: a study of 194 consecutive autopsies”, The American Journal of the Medical Sciences. (1990), 299: pp. 217–221.
McCully K.S., “Keeping the Young-Elderly Healthy.  Homocysteine, vitamins, and vascular disease prevention”, American Journal of Clinical Nutrition. Nov. 2007 Vol. 86, No. 5, 1563S-1568S. http://www.ajcn.org/cgi/content/full/86/5/1563S

References

1934 births
Living people
American pathologists
American healthcare managers